The European Artistic Roller Skating Championships is the main artistic roller skating  championships in Europe, organized by European Confederation of Roller Skating.

Summary of Championships
The list is incomplete

External links
CERS Official Website

Artistic roller skating competitions
European championships